This is a list of finalists for the 1973 Archibald Prize for portraiture, listed by Artist and Title. As the images are copyright, an external link to an image has been listed where available.

See also 

 Previous year: List of Archibald Prize 1972 finalists
 Next year: List of Archibald Prize 1974 finalists
 List of Archibald Prize winners
 Lists of Archibald Prize finalists

References 

1973
Archibald
Archibald
Archibald Prize 1973
Archibald Prize 1973